Torsten Andersson may refer to:
Torsten Andersson (1926–2009), Swedish modernist painter
Torsten Andersson (politician) (1909–1978), Swedish politician, Member of the Riksdag
Thorsten Andersson (1923–2018), Swedish linguist
Thorsten Andersson (born 1938), Swedish director of the Lantbrukarnas Riksförbund, governor